Two Worlds is a classical music album by jazz musicians Lee Ritenour and Dave Grusin. Guests include Renée Fleming, Gil Shaham, and Julian Lloyd Webber.

Critical reception

AllMusic's Jonathan Widran gives the album 4 out of a possible 5 stars and concludes his review with, "Timeless yet contemporary, Two Worlds is beautiful reunion of these musical soul mates."

Hilarie Grey of JazzTimes begins her favorable review with, "erennial jazz all-stars Lee Ritenour and Dave Grusin reach new career highs with the classically oriented Two Worlds."

Track listing

Charts

References

2000 albums
Lee Ritenour albums
Dave Grusin albums